Guy Goethals (born 26 December 1952) is a Belgian retired football referee.

Career 
Goethals was born in Brussels. He refereed two matches in the UEFA European Football Championship in 1992 and 1996. He is the son of Raymond Goethals.

He officiated during Euro 1992 qualifying, 1994 World Cup qualifying, Euro 1996 qualifying, and the 1991 FIFA World Youth Championship. Goethals is known to have served as a FIFA referee during the period from 1990 to 1996.

References

External links
Profile

1952 births
Belgian football referees
Living people
Sportspeople from Brussels
UEFA Euro 1992 referees
UEFA Euro 1996 referees